Austroponera castaneicolor is an ant species of the subfamily Ponerinae, endemic to the North Island, and the north and north west of the South Island, of New Zealand.

Description 
The worker ants are typically 5.5 - 6.4mm (10 Workers).  Their heads have a width of 1.12 - 1.30mm (10 Workers) with their sides (as seen from the photo provided) slightly and evenly convex. Their eyes are levelled with their antennae. Their mandibles are long with 10 teeth. The colour of their head, body and legs are uniformly yellowish and orange-brown.

Distribution 
The species are typically found in the North and South Island of New Zealand they are more prevalent in the North Island as they are affected by the cold found in the lower South Island: Nelson province, Marlborough. The southernmost known record is a small sample of workers collected near the shore of Lake Moeraki (Westland). A few years earlier, March 29, 1964, workers were collected at Bullock Creek.

References 

 Antweb
 LandCare
 Antwiki
 AntWiki Photo Links
 AntWiki Photo Links
 AntWiki Photo Links

External links

Ponerinae
Ants of New Zealand
Insects described in 1893
Endemic fauna of New Zealand
Hymenoptera of New Zealand
Endemic insects of New Zealand